Cyprinus multitaeniatus is a species of ray-finned fish in the genus Cyprinus from the Xi River basin in China and Gâm River basin in Vietnam.

References

 

Cyprinus
Fish described in 1936